Elijah Akwasi Krahn (born 24 August 2003) is a German professional footballer who plays for 2. Bundesliga club Hamburger SV.

Club career 
Krahn made his professional debut for Hamburger SV on the 6 February 2022, replacing David Kinsombi during a 5–0 away 2. Bundesliga win against SV Darmstadt, delivering an assist to Robert Glatzel in the last goal of the game.

International career
Born in Germany, Krahn is of Ghanaian descent. He is a youth international for Germany, having played up to the Germany U17s.

References

External links

2003 births
Living people
German footballers
Germany youth international footballers
German sportspeople of Ghanaian descent
Association football midfielders
Footballers from Hamburg
Hamburger SV players
2. Bundesliga players